CMS EXEC, or EXEC, is an interpreted, command procedure control, computer scripting language used by the CMS EXEC Processor supplied with the IBM Virtual Machine/Conversational Monitor System (VM/CMS) operating system.

EXEC was written in 1966 by Stuart Madnick at MIT on the model of CTSS RUNCOM.  He originally called this processor COMMAND, and it was later renamed EXEC.

CMS EXEC has been superseded by EXEC 2 and REXX. All three — CMS EXEC, EXEC 2 and REXX — continue to be supported by the IBM CMS product.

The EXEC language
EXEC processes lines up to 130 characters long when entered from a terminal, or 72 characters when read from a file.
A label consisting of a dash followed by up to seven alphanumeric characters can prefix a CMS command or an EXEC control statement.
The interpreter parses commands into blank-delimited tokens of up to eight characters each.
Variables consist of an ampersand followed by up to seven alphanumeric characters.  Variables can be either user-defined variables or pre-defined ("special") EXEC variables.
As each line is read the tokens are scanned.  If they contain EXEC variables the variables are replaced by their value.
Comments. Comments in EXEC files begin with an asterisk in column one.  All other statements are executable statements.
Null statements.  A null statement contains no data items.
CMS commands.  If the first data item on a line is not an asterisk or ampersand the EXEC processor considers the line to be a CMS command and passes it to CMS for immediate execution.
Assignment statements. An assignment statement assigns a value to an EXEC variable. It has the form &variable = <arithmetic-expression>
Control statements.  A statement where the first data item is an EXEC control word and the second is not an equals sign is assumed to be a control statement.
EXEC control words:
&ARGS - allows the user to redefine command arguments.
&BEGPUNCH - heads a series of lines to be spooled to the user's virtual punch.
&BEGSTACK - heads a series of lines to be placed in the user's console input stack.
&BEGTYPE - heads a series of lines to be typed on the user's terminal.
&END - marks the end of the lines processed by &BEGPUNCH, &BEGSTACK, or &BEGTYPE.
&CONTINUE - tells the interpreter to process the next line in the file.
&CONTROL - controls the format in which messages are displayed.
&ERROR - tells the interpreter what to do if an error is detected.
&EXIT - exits the current EXEC file, and optionally sets a return code.
&GOTO - branches to another location in the current EXEC file.  The location can be TOP for the beginning of the file, a label, or a line number.
&IF allows for conditional execution of statements.
&LOOP - heads a group of statements to be executed multiple times, or until a specified condition is true.
&PUNCH - sends a string of tokens to the user's virtual punch.  Each &PUNCH statement generates one card-image, padded or truncated if necessary.
&READ - reads one or more lines from the user's terminal.
&SKIP - skips (ignores) a specified number of lines.
&SPACE - types a specified number of blank lines on the user's terminal.
&STACK - places one line in the user's input stack.  The line is constructed from tokens as for &PUNCH.
&TIME - specifies what timing information is to be typed on the user's terminal following the execution of each CMS command.
&TYPE types a line on the user's terminal.  The line is constructed from tokens as for &PUNCH.
Built-in functions.  The EXEC interpreter provides a few "built-in" or predefined functions:
&CONCAT concatenates a string of tokens.
&DATATYPE examines a token and determines whether it is numeric or alphabetic.
&LENGTH returns the length of a token.
&LITERAL prevents variable substitution within a token.
&SUBSTR extract selected characters from a token.

Sample code
PROFILE EXEC is an EXEC that is automatically executed when a user logs on to tailor their  environment.  A simple PROFILE EXEC might look like the following:
* The following code issues CMS commands to set
* the "blip" character to asterisk and request
* the "short" format for system ready messages.
&CONTROL OFF
SET BLIP *
SET RDYMSG SMSG

Related CMS Command Procedure Control Languages

 CMS EXEC
 EXEC 2
 REXX

References

External links

IBM mainframe operating systems
Scripting languages
VM (operating system)